Drive is an American action drama television series created by Tim Minear and Ben Queen, produced by Minear, Queen, and Greg Yaitanes, and starring Nathan Fillion.  Four episodes aired on the Fox Network in April 2007.  Two unaired episodes were later released directly to digital distribution.

The series is set against the backdrop of an illegal cross-country automobile road race, focusing on the willing and unwilling competitors and, as the plot develops, the unseen puppet masters who sponsor the race. Minear has described the show's thematic tone by saying "a secret, illegal, underground road race can be anything from Cannonball Run to The Game to North by Northwest to Magnolia-on-wheels. Ours is all those things."

Drive was the first TV show in history which had a live Twitter session during an episode. The account @foxdrive still exists.

The show premiered on April 13, 2007 on CTV in Canada. It debuted in the United States on April 15, 2007 on Fox, and moved into its regular time slot on Mondays the next day; in that slot it faced stiff competition from NBC's Deal or No Deal and ABC's Dancing with the Stars. On April 25, Fox canceled Drive after only four episodes had aired. The series has not yet been released to international markets (with the exception of Canada) or on DVD.

Cast and characters

Route
The following are the checkpoints passed, clues and/or instructions before arrival, and the specifics regarding them.

Episodes 
A total of six episodes of Drive were produced, four of them were aired prior to its cancellation. The series premiered on April 13, 2007 in Canada and on April 15, 2007 in the United States.

Production notes
Fox greenlit series production on Drive in October 2006. In addition to the series pilot, another twelve episodes were ordered as a midseason replacement for spring 2007.

Filming locations
Drive was shot in the Los Angeles area, using road footage and green-screen technology. According to Tim Minear, "because of technology, we can actually create a cross-country road race and shoot it all in Santa Clarita." This led to geographic inconsistencies in the series, including mountains and desert settings visible during highway scenes set near Gainesville, Florida, when there are no actual mountain ranges or deserts in that area.

Highway scenes were shot on Interstate 210 in Rialto, California on the finished but unopened portion between Alder Ave. and Linden Ave. The exit for Alder Ave can be seen as the exit in most of the freeway scenes. In the first episode, the Alder Ave. sign for the exit is clearly legible. Scenes at the "Kennedy Space Center" were filmed at the Ambassador Auditorium in Pasadena, California.

Music
 Gavin Rossdale – "Can't Stop the World"
 The Doors – "Roadhouse Blues (Crystal Method Remix)"
 Bloc Party – "Kreuzberg"
 Nine Pound Hammer – "Radar Love"
 X – "The Hungry Wolf"
 Lunatic Calm – "Leave You Far Behind"
 Ghost in the Machine – "King of My World"
 Yonderboi – "Soulbitch"
 The Rhones – "Quitter"
 Crystal Method – "Bad Ass"

Cancellation
The two-hour premiere of Drive in the United States, broadcast on April 15, 2007 at 8:00 pm, was watched by six million viewers. The program did not deliver the ratings Fox desired, and on April 25, 2007, the network announced that it had cancelled Drive. The final two remaining unaired episodes of Drive were made available for online streaming on Fox on Demand beginning Sunday, July 15, 2007, in addition to the previously aired episodes. All six episodes of the show were previously been made available for purchase and download from the iTunes Store and Amazon Video on Demand exclusively for United States residents, but are no longer available since then. As of April 2021, the whole series, including the unaired episodes, can now be seen on Fox Corporation's free ad-supported streaming service Tubi.

Fox initially announced that the final two episodes would air on July 4, 2007. The network rescheduled them for July 13 and later pulled them entirely. The two remaining episodes were posted online on July 15, 2007. Executive producers Tim Minear and Craig Silverstein subsequently gave an interview that described what might have happened if the series had continued.

To the question "Which single work of yours do you feel didn’t get the attention it deserved?", Nathan Fillion said: "I would say I did a series called Drive that would’ve been a really good TV series if more than two episodes had aired. It was a lot of fun and it was very short lived. Sometimes I forget I was in it."

Awards and nominations 
Drive, while short-lived, is the first series to be nominated for an Emmy Award under the organization's new "broadband" eligibility guidelines. The show's title sequence had originally been submitted for consideration in the category of "Outstanding Visual Effects in a Drama Series". However, Emmy regulations require a series to air at least six episodes in order to be eligible, whereas Drive had only aired four episodes prior to its cancellation. After the sequence was posted for streaming on the Internet, it became eligible under the new "Outstanding Visual Effects in a Television Miniseries, Movie, or Special" category.

In popular culture
 In the September 2007 issue of Marvel Comics' Friendly Neighborhood Spider-Man, Peter Parker comments that "ever since Fox cancelled Drive, it's been one piece of bad luck after another."

Citations

General and cited references 
 Official website
 Shales, Tom (14 April 2007). "Fox's 'Drive': It Can't Get There From Here". The Washington Post, p. C1.

External links 
 

2000s American drama television series
2007 American television series debuts
2007 American television series endings
American action television series
English-language television shows
Fox Broadcasting Company original programming
Serial drama television series
Television series by 20th Century Fox Television
Television shows set in Florida